Committed is a 2000 comedy film directed and written by Lisa Krueger and stars Heather Graham, Casey Affleck, and Luke Wilson.

Plot 
The ever-optimistic Joline faces a challenge when her husband, flaky news photographer Carl, leaves the couple's New York City loft to find himself in Texas. Joline tracks Carl down to El Paso and observes him outside of his mobile home without his knowledge. She acquaints herself with Carl's schedule and his new friends, including his new girlfriend, Carmen, and his neighbor Neil. Neil, a quirky sculptor, becomes smitten with Joline. Back in New York, Joline's brother Jay goes off in search for his sister and ends up joining her in Texas. Eventually Carl spots Joline, and Joline seeks new ways of returning Carl to her life, up to and including mystic remedies provided by Carmen's grandfather.

Cast

Reception

Release 
Committed premiered at the 2000 Sundance Film Festival, where it was nominated for the Grand Jury Prize and won the award for Best Cinematography. The film had a limited theatrical release on April 28, 2000.

Critical response 
On Rotten Tomatoes, 43% of 46 surveyed critics gave the film a positive review; the average rating is 5.40/10.  The site's consensus reads: "Critics say Committed is one of those films that shows promise – some sort of vision – of what the movie could have been. The key word is 'could'. As it is, the script is predictable, the story becomes tedious, and it's simply not funny. Heather Graham shows she can play a central character, but she's not enough to make Committed successful." On Metacritic it has a score of 44% based on reviews from 22 critics, indicating "mixed or average reviews". Metro Silicon Valleys reviewer, Richard von Busack, criticized the film's "tiresome daffiness" and said it "indulges in the worst intellectual habit of the '60s counterculture—it supports putting a principle ahead of common sense". In his review, A. O. Scott of The New York Times said the film has interesting ideas but fails to explore them. He also criticized the film's uncertain tone.

Committed was nominated for the Golden Reel Award for Best Sound Editing.

References

External links
 
 

2000 films
2000 comedy-drama films
American comedy-drama films
Miramax films
Sundance Film Festival award winners
Films set in Texas
Films shot in El Paso, Texas
Films about stalking
2000s English-language films
2000s American films
2000 independent films